Political Department was the name of:

 Federal Department of Foreign Affairs of Switzerland, named "Federal Political Department" until 1978
 Indian Political Department, a  government department in British India
 Politische Abteilung ("Political Department"), one of five departments of Nazi concentration camps